Stenoptilia caroli is a moth of the family Pterophoridae. It is found in Nepal and  India (Kashmir).

The wingspan is 15–16 mm. Adults have been recorded in July.

References

Moths described in 1988
caroli
Moths of Asia